Liars is the fourth studio album by the band Liars, released on August 28, 2007. The album was recorded at Planet Roc, Los Angeles and was produced by the band and Jeremy Glover.

The album was preceded by a week by the single release of "Plaster Casts of Everything". The single release of Plaster Casts was accompanied by a videoclip. The song "Freak Out" was #91 on Rolling Stones list of the 100 Best Songs of 2007.

"Plaster Casts of Everything" was listed in Pitchfork Media's "Top 500 songs of the 2000s" at #248.

The track "Leather Prowler" was used as the instrumental for "Leather Head" by Tyler, The Creator for his alternative hip-hop collective OFWGKTA's mixtape Radical.

Track listing
 "Plaster Casts of Everything" – 3:56
 "Houseclouds" – 3:21
 "Leather Prowler" – 4:25
 "Sailing to Byzantium" – 4:02
 "What Would They Know" – 3:11
 "Cycle Time" – 2:16
 "Freak Out" – 2:30
 "Pure Unevil" – 3:52
 "Clear Island" – 2:38
 "The Dumb in the Rain" – 4:21
 "Protection" – 4:30

Personnel
Liars
 Angus Andrew – vocals, guitars, backing vocals
 Julian Gross – drums, backing vocals, percussions
 Aaron Hemphill – guitars, synthesizers, programming, backing vocals
 Jeremy Glover – bass (track 4, 6 & 8)

'Liars' Session EP
On October 24, 2007, four tracks were available for free download from Liars' MySpace page.

The track list is composed of demo versions of the following songs from the album:
 "Cycle Time" – 2:24
 "Houseclouds" – 3:27
 "Pure Unevil" – 3:58
 "Plaster Casts of Everything" – 4:02

References

External links
 Pitchfork: Liar's Fourth Album Revealed!

2007 albums
Liars (band) albums
Mute Records albums